Şakir Deniz also known as Şakiro (born in 1936 in Eleşkirt–1996, Izmir, Turkey), was a Kurdish Dengbêj singer. His songs were often recorded on cassettes and distributed illegally, when the Kurdish language faced limitations in cultural expression in Turkey. He is one of the most prominent figures for Dengbêj in recent times. His and the recordings of other Dengbêjs such as Karapete Xaco are considered a resource for the ones who also want to become Denbêj singers. He once met such an apprentice and foresaw that he will be seen as a Dengbej who sings in the Şakiro style.

Early life 
The family of Şakiro, who were from the Zilan tribe, lived in the village of Qerqa near Mount Elegez in present-day Armenia before fleeing to the village of Kela Topraqqalê in present-day Eleşkirt district of Turkey, due to the conflict between the Russian and Ottoman empires.

Şakiro was born officially in 1936 (however it is also possible that he was born in 1931) while he spent most of his youth in nearby Cemalverdî village where he was exposed to Dengbêj songs from an early age.

References

Kurds in Turkey

Kurdish singers
People from Ağrı

1936 births
1996 deaths